California Volunteers, also known as the California Volunteers' Memorial and the Spanish–American War Memorial, is an outdoor sculpture installed in 1906 by Douglas Tilden.

History
California Volunteers was originally installed at the intersection of Market and Van Ness, per the request of the sponsoring committee of citizens and the sculptor. 

The monument cost $25,000. Funding for the monument came from surplus donations for a reception held for the volunteers from California upon their return from the Philippines.

The monument was dedicated on Sunday, August 12, 1906. During the ceremony, several dignitaries gave speeches, including former San Francisco Mayor Phelan; current Mayor Schmitz; California Governor Pardee; and General James F. Smith, Governor-General of the Philippines.

In 1925, it was moved to its present location at the corner of Market and Dolores Street.

Design
The central figure depicts Bellona, goddess of war, riding on the back of Pegasus, the winged horse. (The 1906 San Francisco Call article reporting from the dedication ceremony describes the riding figure as Victory). There are two soldiers on the monument, one fallen, and one standing to the side armed with a pistol. One side of the pedestal is inscribed with the text "Erected by the Citizens of San Francisco in Honor of the California Volunteers, Spanish–American War, 1898. First to the Front."

Shortly after its dedication in August 1906, Will Sparks criticized the original placement of the monument at Market and Van Ness, stating "from many points of view, including one of the most important, the [silhouette] is absolutely meaningless. Looking down Van Ness avenue it is impossible to tell what it is that surmounts the pedestal. There is nothing but a tangled mess of bronze." Sparks went on to recommend the monument should be relocated "up beside a building where only the one impressive side would show. Do this with it and it will become a great monument. As it is there is much that is disappointing."

See also
 1906 in art

References

External links

 
 
 

1906 establishments in California
1906 sculptures
Castro District, San Francisco
Equestrian statues in California
Monuments and memorials in California
Outdoor sculptures in San Francisco
Sculptures of men in California
Spanish–American War memorials in the United States
Statues in San Francisco